The 2019–20 season was Sarajevo's 71st season in existence, and their 26th consecutive season in the top flight of Bosnian football, the Premier League of BiH. Besides competing in the Premier League, the team also competed in the National Cup. Sarajevo competed in the qualifications for the UEFA Champions League, as well as competing in the qualifications for the UEFA Europa League. The season covers the period from 14 June 2019 to 1 June 2020.

In that season, the league ended abruptly on 1 June 2020 due to the COVID-19 pandemic in Bosnia and Herzegovina and by default Sarajevo won their second consecutive league title as the first placed team, also qualifying to the 2020–21 UEFA Champions League qualifying rounds as well.

Squad information

First-team squad

(C)

(Captain)

(Captain)
(Captain)

(C)

Transfers

Transfers in

Transfers out

Loans in

Loans out

Kit

Friendlies

Pre-season

Mid-season

Competitions

Overview

Premier League

League table

Results summary

Results by round

Matches

Cup of Bosnia and Herzegovina

Round of 32

Round of 16

UEFA Champions League

Sarajevo entered the UEFA Champions League at the first qualifying round.

First qualifying round
On 18 June, Sarajevo were drawn to face Celtic  (Scotland) in the First qualifying round of the UEFA Champions League.

UEFA Europa League

During the draw on 18 June, the loser of the match Sarajevo-Celtic was drawn to directly enter the UEFA Europa League third qualifying round.

Third qualifying round

Statistics

Squad appearances and goals

|-
! colspan="14" style="background:#dcdcdc; text-align:center"|Goalkeepers

|-
! colspan="14" style="background:#dcdcdc; text-align:center"|Defenders

|-
! colspan="14" style="background:#dcdcdc; text-align:center"|Midfielders

|-
! colspan="14" style="background:#dcdcdc; text-align:center"|Forwards

|}
Number after the "+" sign represents the number of games player started the game on the bench and was substituted on.

Goalscorers

Hat-tricks

(H) – Home ; (A) – Away

Clean sheets

References

External links

FK Sarajevo seasons
Sarajevo
2019–20 UEFA Champions League participants seasons
2019–20 UEFA Europa League participants seasons